The Return of the Joker is a storyline in Batman Comics, featuring a villain posing as Batman's archenemy, Joker, believed to be dead. It was published by DC Comics in February 2001.

Plot 
The story opens with a judge found dead by hanging. Investigating the case, Commissioner Gordon believes that Joker is the culprit. Bruce Wayne sends his ward, Tim Drake, to school in Tokyo to spare him from Jason Todd's fate. The Joker then attacks an investment party, stealing cash and jewels from the audience.

Gordon feels something is different about how the Joker operates and concludes that this Joker is an impostor. Meanwhile, the genuine Joker fumes at his name being wrongly used in his hideout. Then, still recovering from the near-death experience he suffered in the "Death in the Family" storyline, he decides to regain his confidence by committing a series of crimes as his old alter-ego, the Red Hood.

After regaining his self-confidence, the Joker goes after the impostor with Batman in pursuit. Both Jokers meet in a violent confrontation in which the real Joker gains the upper hand. Batman and the police stop them, but both of the Jokers escape. The impostor lures his three pursuers to the chemical plant where the Joker was born. To become like his idol, the impostor jumps into the vat of toxic waste which disfigured the Joker — only for him to die instantly. Batman arrests the real Joker, who willingly gives up.

Continuity 
"The Return of the Joker" is the continuing story-arc after "A Death in the Family". The Joker's origins were depicted before in "The Man Behind The Red Hood!" story-arc, which was later re-imagined in the one-shot graphic novel Batman: The Killing Joke.

Additional Information 
The issue has 52 pages, and it was on sale for 2,95 USD and 4,50 CAD in 2001. 

The cover page is signed by Craig Rousseau on the pencils and Rob Leigh on Inks.

Joker (character) titles
Comics by Marv Wolfman